Luik is an Estonian surname meaning "swan". It may refer to:

Aivi Luik (born 1985), Australian football player
Hans H. Luik (born 1961), Estonian journalist, theatre critic and media entrepreneur
Helmuth Luik (1928–2009), Estonian chess player
John Luik (born 1950), American philosopher
Jüri Luik (born 1966), Estonian politician and diplomat
Karl Luik (1883–1948), Estonian politician
Lauri Luik (born 1982), Estonian politician
Liina Luik (born 1985), Estonian long-distance runner, one of triplet
Lily Luik (born 1985), Estonian long-distance runner, one of triplet
Leila Luik (born 1985), Estonian long-distance runner, one of triplet
Margus Luik (born 1980), Estonian racewalker
Sulev Luik (1954–1997), Estonian actor
Terje Luik (born 1941), Estonian actress
Viivi Luik (born 1946), Estonian author
Vilma Luik (born 1959), Estonian actress

See also 
 Luick (surname)
 Liège, Belgian city known in the Dutch language as  

Estonian-language surnames